The Diocese of Garagoa is a Latin Church ecclesiastical territory or diocese of the Catholic Church Colombia. It is a suffragan diocese in the ecclesiastical province of the metropolitan Archdiocese of Tunja.

Its cathedral is Catedral de Nuestra Señora del Rosario de Chiquinquirá, dedicated to Our Lady of the Rosary, in the episcopal see of Garagoa, Boyacá Department.

History 
 26 April 1977: Established as Diocese of Garagoa, on territory split off from its metropolitan, the Archdiocese of Tunja.

Statistics 
, it pastorally served 174,000 Catholics (97.8% of 178,000 total) on 4,400 km² in 31 parishes and 2 missions with 48 priests (47 diocesan, 1 religious), 39 lay religious (1 brother, 38 sisters) and 12 seminarians.

Bishops

Episcopal ordinaries
Suffragan Bishops of Garagoa 
 Juan Eliseo Mojica Oliveros (1977.04.26 – death 1989.12.27), previously Titular Bishop of Baliana (1967.02.20 – 1970.06.04) as Auxiliary Bishop of Archdiocese of Tunja (Colombia) (1967.02.20 – 1970.06.04)
 Guillermo Alvaro Ortiz Carrillo (1989.12.27 – death 2000.02.24), previously Bishop of Jericó (Colombia) (1970.06.04 – 1977.04.26)
 José Vicente Huertas Vargas (2000.06.23 – retired 2017.06.15)
 Julio Hernando García Peláez (2017.06.15 – ...); previously Titular Bishop of Bida (2005.02.11 – 2010.06.05) as Auxiliary Bishop of Archdiocese of Cali (Colombia) (2005.02.11 – 2010.06.05), Bishop of Istmina–Tadó (Colombia) (2010.06.05 – 2017.06.15) and Apostolic Administrator of Quibdó (Colombia) (2011.03 – 2013.01.30).

Coadjutor bishop
Guillermo Alvaro Ortiz Carrillo (1989)

Other priests of this diocese who became bishops
Misael Vacca Ramirez, appointed Bishop of Yopal in 2001
Luis Felipe Sánchez Aponte, appointed Bishop of Chiquinquirá in 2004

See also 
 List of Catholic dioceses in Colombia
 Roman Catholicism in Colombia

References

Sources and external links 
 GCatholic.org, with Google map - data for all sections

Roman Catholic dioceses in Colombia
Roman Catholic Ecclesiastical Province of Tunja
Religious organizations established in 1977
Roman Catholic dioceses and prelatures established in the 20th century
1977 establishments in Colombia